Branham may refer to:

Branham (surname)
4140 Branham, a main-belt asteroid
Branham (VTA), a light rail station operated by Santa Clara Valley Transportation Authority
Branham High School, a secondary school located in San Jose, California

See also
Barnham (disambiguation)
Branham House (disambiguation)
Branham sign